Terminal Railroad or Terminal Railway may refer to:
Terminal railroad, a railroad that operates a terminal facility
Terminal Railway Alabama State Docks
Terminal Railway of Buffalo, predecessor of the New York Central Railroad
Terminal Railroad (Chicago), predecessor of the Indiana Harbor Belt Railroad
Terminal Railroad of East St. Louis, predecessor of the Terminal Railroad Association of St. Louis
Terminal Railway (Oregon), predecessor of the Southern Pacific Company
Terminal Railroad Association of St. Louis